Nathan Anthony Lewis (born 20 July 1990) is a Trinidadian international footballer who plays as a midfielder.

Club career
Born in Maloney, he has played club football in Trinidad for Caledonia AIA, San Juan Jabloteh and Central.

He signed for American team Indy Eleven in February 2018, alongside fellow Central teammate Carlyle Mitchell.

He signed for Lansing Ignite in January 2019. After their inaugural 2019 season, Lansing Ignite ceased operations.

International career
He made his international debut for Trinidad and Tobago in 2016.

International goals
Scores and results list Trinidad and Tobago's goal tally first.

References

External links 
 

1990 births
Living people
Trinidad and Tobago footballers
Trinidad and Tobago international footballers
Trinidad and Tobago expatriate footballers
Trinidad and Tobago expatriate sportspeople in the United States
Association football midfielders
Central F.C. players
Expatriate soccer players in the United States
Indy Eleven players
Lansing Ignite FC players
Morvant Caledonia United players
San Juan Jabloteh F.C. players
TT Pro League players
USL Championship players
USL League One players
2019 CONCACAF Gold Cup players